The Wales Governance Centre (WGC) is a research centre and think-tank based Cardiff, Wales, which specialises in research into the law, politics, government and political economy of Wales, as well the wider territorial governance of the UK and Europe. It was established shortly after the 1997 Welsh devolution referendum, and was founded by Barry Jones in 1999. Its current director is Professor Richard Wyn Jones, and it is a part of Cardiff University.

History 

The centre was established following the 1997 Welsh devolution referendum and during the debate about implementing the programme of devolution in Wales.

The Centre produces the nationally reported coverage of Welsh politics of the Elections in Wales Etholiadau yng Nghymru blog written by Professor Roger Awan-Scully.

In 2019 it established a new branch, the Wales Fiscal Analysis, to focus on "authoritative and independent research" into the public finances, taxation and public expenditures of Wales.

Funding 

The WGC funded by Cardiff University through Research Councils UK and the European Research Council.

The centre has worked with a number of other organisations on jointly funded projects including the Public Policy Institute for Wales, the Institute of Welsh Affairs, the Welsh Centre for International Affairs, UK in a Changing Europe, University College London, the Electoral Reform Society Cymru, the Rowntree Charitable Trust and the Nuffield Foundation.

Notable people 
A number of academics from across Wales are currently, or have previously been involved with the institute.

 Professor Richard Wyn Jones
 Professor Roger Awan-Scully
 Professor Laura McAllister

Leadership 
Directors

 Professor Richard Wyn Jones (2014–present)
 Barry Jones (1999–2014)

See also 

 List of UK think tanks
 List of Welsh think tanks

References

External links 

 Official website
 Wales Governance Centre at Curlie
 Elections in Wales – Etholiadau yng Nghymru blog

Politics of Cardiff
Political and economic think tanks based in the United Kingdom
Politics of Wales
Economic research institutes
Fiscal policy
Organisations based in Cardiff
Think tanks established in 1999
Research institutes in Wales
Taxation in Wales
1999 establishments in Wales